The Development Bank of Southern Africa (DBSA) is a development finance institution wholly owned by the Government of South Africa. The bank intends to "accelerate sustainable socio-economic development in the Southern African Development Community (SADC) by driving financial and non-financial investments in the social and economic infrastructure sectors".

History, mandate and vision

The Development Bank of Southern Africa is a South African development bank whose stated primary purpose is to promote economic development and growth, improve the quality of lives of people and promote regional integration through infrastructure, finance and development.

The DBSA mandate focuses the banks underlying policy to play a catalytic role in delivering developmental infrastructure in South Africa and the rest of Africa. The Bank's mandate focuses the energy, water, transport and telecommunications sectors, with a secondary focus on health and education. The DBSA is actively involved in all phases of the infrastructure development value chain and plays a key role in infrastructure project preparation, project funding as well as infrastructure implementation and delivery.

The ultimate vision of the DBSA is to achieve a prosperous and integrated resource-efficient region, progressively free of poverty and dependency. Through infrastructure development, the Bank attempts to make a contribution towards people's social and economic ways of life. It also promotes the sustainable use of scarce resources.

Promotion of regional integration through infrastructure is key in Africa's growth agenda and the DBSA plays an integral role in support of this objective. It for example actively participates in programmes such as the South African Renewable Energy Independent Power Producer Procurement Programme (REIPPPP) and the Programme for Infrastructure Development in Africa (PIDA) Priority Action Plan.

Partnerships are a key enabler for the DBSA and the Bank has established a number of key strategic partnerships with global and regional institutions such as the International Development Finance Club (IDFC), SADC's Development Finance Resource Centre (DFRC), the Association of African Development Finance Institutions (AADFI) and the World Economic Forum's Sustainable Development Investment Partnership (SDIP). The Bank is actively involved in managing and implementing funds that support preparation and development of regional integration infrastructure projects. It does this on behalf of national and international partners.  Examples of these include SADC's Project Preparation Development Facility (PPDF) and the Infrastructure Investment Programme for South Africa (IIPSA), which the DBSA manages on behalf of the European Union.

The DBSA is guided by a number of international, regional and local policies, accords and agreements in fulfilling its mandate.  It subscribes to the goals and targets of the United Nations’ Transforming our World: the 2030 Agenda for Sustainable Development, is accredited to the Global Environment Facility and the Green Climate Fund, and in accordance with COP21, supports business innovation and delivering scale to the emerging green economy.

Projects
The DBSA supports the South African government in leveraging skills and capabilities to accelerate the implementation of infrastructure programmes in the key priority sectors of education, health and housing, as well as various municipal infrastructure programmes. DBSA has been collaborating with French DFI, AFD since 1994.

Municipal Infrastructure
The DBSA provides planning, financing and implementation support to municipalities in sectors that include water and sanitation, electricity, roads and houses.

Supported municipal programmes include Tshwane Rapid Transit and financing the Durban University of Technology (DUT) student village.

Economic Infrastructure 
Economic or hard infrastructure is all infrastructure necessary for the functioning of a modern industrial nation. DBSA aims to address capacity and bottleneck constraints in order to optimise economic growth potential by supporting the following sectors:
 Bulk water
 Transportation/logistics
 Power/energy
 Telecommunications
 Liquid fuels (oil/gas)
Past projects include the !Ka Xu Concentrated Solar Power Project.

Social Infrastructure
Social or soft infrastructure is all the institutions which are required to maintain the economic, health, cultural and social standards of a nation or region. DBSA aims to address backlogs and expedite the delivery of essential social services in support of sustainable living conditions and improved quality of life within communities by supporting planning, financing and implementation support to non-municipal infrastructure projects including:
 Higher education
 Student accommodation
 Project implementation support for the construction and maintenance of houses, schools and health facilities
Past projects include emergency repairs and maintenance in health facilities in Limpopo, Masimong Hostel refurbishment Public-private partnership (PPP) and the Accelerated Schools Infrastructure Delivery Initiative.

References

External links

 

Development finance institutions
Banks of South Africa
Companies based in Johannesburg